after twelve years, or  in eight years (G8 or Gy8) describes the reduction of the time spent at a university-preparatory high school from nine school years to eight school years, by having the students take more classes each year. It is implemented in many States of Germany. In the states Berlin, Brandenburg, and Mecklenburg-Vorpommern, the reduction meant a change from seven years to six years spent at in high school because in these states primary education continues until Class 6. In Saxony and Thuringia it is already a long established norm to take the  after twelve years. The principal argument for the reduction is the comparatively long times for vocational education in Germany.

Some federal states have already reversed the reform even though sound academic insights into its effects are scarce.

Year of reform by state

Criticism 
In part, parent, teacher and student organizations express criticism, exclusively from the Western States of Germany. In spite of the removal of one school year, all the contents of the previously thirteen school years were in the curriculum. This means that the school timetable is enlarged and that the students have to be at school between 32 and 40 periods a week. Altogether with the homework given and exam preparations a school week is calculated to encompass an estimated 45 to 55 periods.

However, there is little empirical evidence on the effect of the compression of instructional periods into fewer years of schooling on student outcomes.

References

External links 
 Huebener, M. & Marcus, J. (2015): Moving up a gear: The impact of compressing instructional time into fewer years of schooling, DIW Discussion Papers, No. 1450.
 www.g8-in-bayern.de — The  in eight years in Bavaria

Education in Germany